{{DISPLAYTITLE:C56H42O12}}
The molecular formula C56H42O12 (molar mass: 906.92 g/mol, exact mass: 906.267627 u) may refer to:
 Flexuosol A
 Hopeaphenol
 Hopeahainol A
 Vitisin A (stilbenoid)
 Vitisin B (stilbenoid)
 Vitisin C, a stilbenoid